Aaron Torres (born October 26, 1978) is a professional boxer.

Torres won the bronze medal at the 1999 Pan American Games.  As a pro, he defeated fifteen fighters before facing the 17–4–1 Louis Santiago in a fight where he lost in the 9th of 12 rounds.  He attempted a comeback on the reality show, Contender Season 2, where he lost to Gary Balletto

Torres next went on to fight another Contender contestant in Freddy Curiel. Torres took the fight with only five days notice and lost the fight.

External links
 
 Interview

1978 births
Living people
Boxers from Philadelphia
Boxers at the 1999 Pan American Games
The Contender (TV series) participants
American male boxers
Pan American Games medalists in boxing
Pan American Games bronze medalists for the United States
Welterweight boxers
Medalists at the 1999 Pan American Games